This topic covers events and articles related to 2022 in music

Specific locations

African music 
American music
Asian music
Australian music 
Brazilian music
British music 
Canadian music 
Chinese music
Czech music 
Danish music
European music 
Finnish music
French music
German music
Icelandic music
Indonesian music
Irish music
Italian music
Japanese music
Latin music
Malaysian music
Mongolian music
Norwegian music
Philippine music
Polynesian music
Scandinavian music
South Korean music
Swedish music
Taiwanese music
Vietnamese music

Specific genres 
Classical
Country
Electronic
Jazz 
Latin
Heavy Metal
Hip Hop
Rock

Albums released

Awards

Bands formed
 Acid Angel from Asia
 Apink Chobom
 Astro – Jinjin & Rocky
 ATBO
 Blank2y
 Classy
 CSR
 ExWhyZ
 Got the Beat
 H1-Key
 ILY:1
 Irris
 Kep1er
 Lapillus
 Le Sserafim
 L.S. Dunes
 Mamamoo+
 Metamuse
 Mimiirose
 NewJeans
 Nmixx
 Ocha Norma
 TAN
 Tempest
 TNX
 Travis Japan
 Trendz
 Viviz
 XG
 Younite

Soloist debuts
 Akari Akase
 Anji Salvacion
 Baekho
 Cho Mi-yeon
 Choi Ye-na
 Jeremy Lee
 Jelo The Weirdo
 Kent Itō
 Kihyun
 Kim Jong-hyeon
 Krystian Wang
 Lauren Spencer-Smith
 Lee Chan-hyuk
 Markus
 Miyeon
 Nayeon
 SennaRin
 Seulgi
 Shanaia Gomez
 Wonpil
 Xiumin
 Yerin
 Yoshino Aoyama
 Yuju
 Yuki Yomichi

Bands reformed
 The Academy Is...
 Be Your Own Pet
 Big Bang
 Bluebottle Kiss
 DNCE
 Doping Panda
 EXID
 Get Scared
 Girls' Generation
 Hanoi Rocks
 Kara
 Kisschasy
 The Mars Volta
 Mrs. Green Apple
 Pantera
 Pavement
 Pink Floyd (a one off recording, "Hey, Hey, Rise Up!", in aid of Ukrainian Humanitarian relief, following the Russian invasion of Ukraine)
 Pity Sex
 Rival Schools
 Roxy Music
 Sleep
 Sunk Loto
 Sunny Day Real Estate
 TISM
 Unwound
 Yellowcard
 t.A.T.u.

Bands disbanded

 April
 Aswad
 The Birds of Satan
 Botopass
 Bvndit
 BugAboo
 Castanets
 CLC
 D-Crunch
 DEL48
 The Delfonics
 The Detroit Cobras
 Empire
 Every Time I Die
 Gauze
 Genesis
 The Ghost of Paul Revere
 Girlkind
 Girlpool
 The Golden Palominos
 Go to the Beds
 Grim Reaper
 Ho6la
 Hot Issue
 The Judds
 Kids See Ghosts
 Kikagaku Moyo
 Low Roar
 Lunarsolar
 mewithoutYou
 The Mighty Mighty Bosstones
 Mighty Diamonds
 Migos
 MVP
 Neverland Express
 Noisia
 NU'EST
 Okilly Dokilly
 Predia
 Press to Meco
 Procol Harum
 Pupy y Los que Son, Son
 The Pussycat Dolls
 Redsquare
 Roberts and Barrand
 The Saints
 The Shadows of Knight
 Summer Camp
 Supergrass
 Sweet Trip
 Taylor Hawkins and the Coattail Riders
 Torche
 TRCNG
 Waterson:Carthy
 We Girls
 With Confidence
 Wisin & Yandel

Bands on hiatus
 Brockhampton
 BTS
 Circa Survive
 DIA
 Florida Georgia Line
 Laboum
 Little Mix
 Lovelyz
 Mary's Blood
 Violent Soho
 Yoshimotozaka46

Deaths

January
 1 – Mighty Bomber, 93, Trinidadian calypso singer
 2
 Ana Bejerano, 60, Spanish pop singer (Mocedades)
 Kenny J, 69, Trinidadian calypso and soca singer
 Traxamillion, 42, American hip hop producer
 Jay Weaver, 42, American Christian rock bassist (Big Daddy Weave)
 3 – Lewis Jordan, 74, American pop guitarist and singer (The Jordan Brothers)
 4
 Jessie Daniels, 58, American R&B singer (Force MDs)
 Andrzej Nowak, 63, Polish heavy metal guitarist (TSA)
 5 
 Dale Clevenger, 81, American classical French hornist
 Neil Nongkynrih, 51, Indian classical pianist
 6 
 Carlo Meliciani, 92, Italian opera singer
 Calvin Simon, 79, American funk singer (Parliament-Funkadelic)
 Yoram Taharlev, 83, Israeli pop lyricist
 7 
 Harpdog Brown, 59, Canadian blues singer and harmonica player
 Koady Chaisson, 37, Canadian folk banjoist (The East Pointers)
 Bobby Harrison, 82, British psychedelic rock drummer and singer (Procol Harum, Freedom, Snafu)
 Marc Dé Hugar, 52, Australian glam metal guitarist (Candy Harlots)
 R. Dean Taylor, 82, Canadian pop singer-songwriter
 8 
 Marilyn Bergman, 93, American pop lyricist
 Ramdas Kamat, 90, Indian Marathi theatre singer
 Michael Lang, 77, American tour promoter and producer
 9 
 Maria Ewing, 71, American opera singer
 James Mtume, 76, American jazz and R&B multi-instrumentalist (Mtume)
 Desmond de Silva, 78, Sri Lankan pop and baila singer
 10 
 Gerry Granahan, 89, American rock and roll and pop singer-songwriter
 Francis Jackson, 104, British classical organist and composer
 Khan Jamal, 75, American jazz vibraphonist
 Burke Shelley, 71, British heavy metal singer and bassist (Budgie)
 11
 Bruce Anderson, 72, American experimental rock guitarist (MX-80)
 Martin Carrizo, 50, Argentine rock and heavy metal drummer (A.N.I.M.A.L., Indio Solari)
 Rosa Lee Hawkins, 76, American pop and R&B singer (The Dixie Cups)
 Jordi Sabatés, 73, Spanish sunshine pop and classical pianist (Pic-Nic)
 12 
 Everett Lee, 105, American classical violinist and conductor
 Waiphot Phetsuphan, 79, Thai Luk Thung singer
 Ronnie Spector, 78, American R&B and pop singer (The Ronettes)
 13 
 CPO Boss Hogg, 52, American rapper
 Fred Parris, 85, American doo-wop singer and songwriter (The Five Satins)
 Sonny Turner, 82, American R&B singer (The Platters)
 Fred Van Hove, 84, Belgian free jazz pianist
 14
 Dallas Frazier, 82, American country singer-songwriter
 Greg Webster, 84, American funk drummer (Ohio Players)
 15
 Ralph Emery, 88, American radio disc jockey
 Jon Lind, 73, American folk rock and pop singer-songwriter and guitarist (Howdy Moon)
 Rachel Nagy, 48, American blues rock singer (The Detroit Cobras)
 Beverly Ross, 87, American pop singer-songwriter (Ronald & Ruby)
 16 – Carmela Corren, 83, Israeli-Austrian pop singer
 17 – Armando Gama, 67, Portuguese pop singer
 18 
 Dick Halligan, 78, American jazz rock multi-instrumentalist (Blood, Sweat & Tears) and film composer
 Freddie Hughes, 78, American gospel and soul singer
 Tito Matos, 53, American bomba percussionist (Viento de Agua)
 19 – Badal Roy, 82, Indian-American jazz fusion tabla player
 20
 Meat Loaf, 74, American rock singer
 Tom Smith, 65, American experimental rock multi-instrumentalist (To Live and Shave in L.A., Peach of Immortality)
 Elza Soares, 91, Brazilian samba and bossa nova singer
 Karolos Trikolidis, 74, Austrian classical conductor
 21 – Terry Tolkin, 62, American music journalist and music executive (Elektra Records), coined the term "alternative music"
 22
 Kirti Shiledar, 69, Indian classical singer
 Don Wilson, 88, American surf rock guitarist (The Ventures)
 23 – Beegie Adair, 84, American jazz pianist
 24
 Osvaldo Peredo, 91, Argentine tango singer
 Boris Pfeiffer, 53, German folk metal multi-instrumentalist (In Extremo)
 25 
 Hardev Dilgir, 82, Indian folk lyricist
 Andy Ross, 66, British punk rock singer and guitarist (Disco Zombies) and music executive (Food Records)
 Pat King, 77–78, Scottish progressive rock bassist (Manfred Mann's Earth Band)
 26 – Janet Mead, 84, Australian Christian music singer
 27
 Alain Bancquart, 87, French classical composer
 Diego Verdaguer, 70, Argentine-Mexican pop singer
 29 – Sam Lay, 86, American blues drummer (The Paul Butterfield Blues Band)
 30 
 Jon Appleton, 83, American electronic composer, co-inventor of the Synclavier
 Philip Paul, 96, American jazz, blues, and R&B drummer
 Hargus "Pig" Robbins, 84, American country and rock pianist
 Norma Waterson, 82, British folk singer (The Watersons)
 31 
 Alejandro Alonso, 69, Mexican Christian rock guitarist
 Jimmy Johnson, 93, American blues guitarist
 Trey Johnson, 53, American rock singer and guitarist (Sorta)

February
 1 
 Hiroshima, Japanese hardcore punk drummer (GISM)
 Glenn Wheatley, 74, Australian rock bassist (The Masters Apprentices)
 Leslie Parnas, 90, American classical cellist
 Jon Zazula, 59, American record executive (Megaforce Records)
 2 
 Endo Anaconda, 66, Swiss pop singer-songwriter (Stiller Has)
 Joe Diorio, 85, American jazz guitarist
 Willie Leacox, 74, American folk rock drummer (America)
 3 – Donny Gerrard, 75, Canadian pop rock singer (Skylark)
 4
 Kerry Chater, 76, Canadian rock bassist and songwriter (Gary Puckett & The Union Gap)
 Gianluca Floris, 57, Italian opera singer
 5
 Rubén Fuentes, 95, Mexican classical and mariachi violinist
 Damodar Hota, 86, Indian classical singer
 6 
 George Crumb, 92, American classical composer
 Syl Johnson, 85, American blues guitarist
 Lata Mangeshkar, 92, Indian playback singer
 7 – Zbigniew Namysłowski, 82, Polish jazz multi-instrumentalist
 8 – Bruce Greig, 54, American death metal guitarist (Misery Index, Dying Fetus)
 9 
 Betty Davis, 77, American funk singer
 Ian McDonald, 75, British progressive rock multi-instrumentalist (King Crimson, Foreigner)
 Nora Nova, 93, Bulgarian pop singer
 10
 Walter Barylli, 100, Austrian classical violinist
 Brian Dunning, 71, Irish classical and Celtic flautist (Nightnoise)
 Roman Kostrzewski, 61, Polish thrash metal singer (Kat)
 Owen Moran, 62, British new wave bassist (Cook da Books)
 Steve Salas, 70, American Latin musician (El Chicano, Tierra)
 11 – Mike Rabon, 78, American rock singer and guitarist (The Five Americans)
 12
 Miguel Vicens Danus, 78, Spanish pop-rock bassist (Los Bravos)
 Howard Grimes, 80, American soul drummer (Hi Rhythm Section)
 Bob DeMeo, 66, American jazz drummer 
 13 – King Louie Bankston, 49, American power pop and garage rock singer-songwriter and guitarist (The Exploding Hearts)
 14 
 Ralf Bursy, 66, German pop singer
 Sandy Nelson, 83, American rock and roll drummer
 Roger Segal, 49, American punk rock bassist (Trashlight Vision)
 15 
 Bappi Lahiri, 69, Indian disco singer and composer
 Sandhya Mukherjee, 90, Indian playback singer
 Vivi l'internationale, 75, Beninese pop singer
 16 – Ramón Stagnaro, 67, Peruvian folk guitarist
 17 
 Dallas Good, 48, Canadian rock singer and guitarist (The Sadies)
 David Tyson, 62, American R&B singer (The Manhattans)
 18
 Christopher Scicluna, 62, Maltese pop singer-songwriter (Chris and Moira)
 Scotty Wray, 64, American country guitarist (The Wrays)
 19 
 Gary Brooker, 76, British progressive rock singer-songwriter and keyboardist (Procol Harum, The Paramounts, Ringo Starr & His All-Starr Band)
 Nightbirde, 31, American pop singer
 20 
 Sami Clark, 73, Lebanese pop singer
 Jamal Edwards, 31, British music entrepreneur and DJ
 Sam Henry, 65, American punk drummer (Wipers, The Rats, Napalm Beach)
 Joni James, 91, American pop singer
 Nils Lindberg, 88, Swedish classical composer and pianist
 Teruhiko Saigō, 75, Japanese pop singer
 Setha Sirichaya, 77, Thai rock singer (The Impossibles)
 Martin Yeritsyan, 90, Armenian classical violinist
 21 – Bernardas Vasiliauskas, 83, Lithuanian classical organist
 22
 Muvaffak "Maffy" Falay, 92, Turkish jazz trumpeter (Kenny Clarke/Francy Boland Big Band)
 Mark Lanegan, 57, American alternative rock singer-songwriter (Screaming Trees, The Gutter Twins, Queens of the Stone Age)
 Josephine Veasey, 91, British opera singer
 23
 Carlos Barbosa-Lima, 77, Brazilian jazz and classical guitarist
 Jayananda Lama, 65, Nepali folk singer
 Jaakko Kuusisto, 48, Finnish classical violinist
 Riky Rick, 34, South African rapper
 Antonietta Stella, 92, Italian opera singer
 24 – Don Craine, 76, British R&B singer and guitarist (Downliners Sect)
 25
 Alibaba Mammadov, 93, Azerbaijani mugham singer
 MC Skibadee, 46, British rapper
 Nicky Tesco, 66, British punk rock singer (The Members)
 26 – Snootie Wild, 36, American rapper

March
 1
 Warner Mack, 86, American country singer-songwriter
 Richard Pratt, 69, American R&B singer (Blue Magic)
 2 – Chuck Criss, 36, American indie folk multi-instrumentalist (Freelance Whales)
 3 – Denroy Morgan, Jamaican-American reggae singer
 4 – Jimbeau Hinson, 70, American country singer-songwriter
 5 
 Patricio Renán, 77, Chilean pop rock singer
 Jeff Howell, 60, American rock bassist (Foghat, Outlaws, Savoy Brown)
 Lil Bo Weep, 22, American and australian rapper
 6 
 Mike Cross, 57, American alternative rock guitarist (Sponge)
 Pau Riba i Romeva, 73, Spanish folk rock guitarist
 8
 John Dean, 80, American blue-eyed soul singer (The Reflections)
 Grandpa Elliott, 77, American soul and blues singer and harmonica player
 Ziggy Sigmund, Canadian punk and alternative rock guitarist (Slow, Econoline Crush)
 Isao Suzuki, 89, Japanese jazz bassist
 9 – Richard Podolor, 86, American rock and roll guitarist (The Pets) and record producer
 10 
 Bobbie Nelson, 91, American country pianist (The Family)
 Gennadiy Pavlik, 52, Ukrainian classical and traditional folk singer (Veryovka Ukrainian Folk Choir)
 Jessica Williams, 73, American jazz pianist
 11
 Guayo Cedeño, 48, Honduran rock singer
 Brad Martin, 48, American country singer
 Timmy Thomas, 77, American soul singer
 12
 Barry Bailey, 73, American rock guitarist (Atlanta Rhythm Section)
 Traci Braxton, 50, American R&B singer (The Braxtons)
 Kandikonda, 48, Indian film lyricist
 Pete St. John, 90, Irish folk singer-songwriter
 13
 Li Guangxi, 92, Chinese opera singer
 Mary Lee, 100, Scottish jazz singer
 14 – Eric Mercury, 77, Canadian R&B singer
 15 
 Dennis González, 67, American free jazz trumpeter
 Barbara Maier Gustern, 82, American vocal coach and musical theater singer
 16 
 Barbara Morrison, 72, American jazz singer
 Bobby Weinstein, 92, American pop songwriter
 18 – Bernabé Martí, 93, Spanish opera singer
 19 – Michail Jurowski, 76, Russian classical conductor
 21 – LaShun Pace, 60, American gospel singer
 22 
 Eva Castillo, 52, Filipino pop singer
 Pierre Papadiamandis, 85, French pop pianist and singer
 23 – Zinaida Ignatyeva, 84, Russian classical pianist
 24 – John McLeod, 88, Scottish classical composer
 25
 Taylor Hawkins, 50, American alternative rock drummer (Foo Fighters, Taylor Hawkins and the Coattail Riders)
 Bobby Hendricks, 84, American R&B singer (The Drifters)
 Philip Jeck, 69, British avant garde and electronic composer and turntablist
 Keith Martin, 55, American R&B singer
 26 
 Jeff Carson, 58, American country singer
 Bang Jun-seok, 51, South Korean film composer
 Tina May, 60, British jazz singer
 Keaton Pierce, 31, American post-hardcore singer (Too Close to Touch)
 28 – Mira Calix, South African electronic composer
 29 
 Irini Konitopoulou-Legaki, 90, Greek folk singer
 Jun Lopito, 64, Filipino rock guitarist
 Donald "Tabby" Shaw, 66, Jamaican reggae singer (Mighty Diamonds)
 30 
 Francisco González, 68, American Chicano rock mandolinist and harpist (Los Lobos)
 Tom Parker, 33, British pop singer (The Wanted)
 Nathaniel Ian Wynter, 66, Jamaican reggae keyboardist (Bob Marley and the Wailers)
 31 – Fred Johnson, 80, American doo-wop singer (The Marcels)

April
 1 
 C. W. McCall, 93, American country singer
 Fitzroy "Bunny" Simpson, 70, Jamaican reggae singer (Mighty Diamonds)
 Roland White, 83, American bluegrass mandolinist (Kentucky Colonels, Nashville Bluegrass Band, Country Gazette)
 4 – Joe Messina, 93, American R&B guitarist
 5 
 Bobby Rydell, 79, American rock and roll singer
 Paul Siebel, 84, American country rock singer-songwriter and guitarist
 6
 Helen Golden, 81, Dutch pop singer
 Wen Hsia, 93, Taiwanese pop singer
 7 – Birgit Nordin, 88, Swedish opera singer
 8
 Wade Buff, 87, American pop singer (The Dream Weavers)
 Con Cluskey, Irish pop musician (The Bachelors)
 Nagai Sriram, 41, Indian Carnatic violinist
 9 
 Chris Bailey, 65, Kenyan-born Australian punk rock singer-songwriter and guitarist (The Saints)
 John Rossi, American blues rock drummer (Roomful of Blues)
 10 – Mario Martínez, Spanish new wave guitarist (La Unión)
 12 
 David Freel, 64, American indie rock singer and guitarist (Swell)
 Charles E. McCormick, 75, American R&B singer (Bloodstone)
 13 
 Archie Eversole, 37, German-born American rapper
 Tim Feerick, American post-hardcore bassist (Dance Gavin Dance)
 Gloria Parker, 100, American jazz marimba and glass harp player
 14
 Orlando Julius, 79, Nigerian afrobeat saxophonist
 Trygve Thue, 71, Norwegian rock guitarist
 16 – Bill Bourne, 68, Canadian folk rock singer-songwriter (Tri-Continental)
 17
 Roderick Clark, 49, American R&B singer (Hi-Five)
 Prafulla Kar, 83, Indian playback singer
 DJ Kay Slay, 55, American hip hop disc jockey
 Radu Lupu, 76, Romanian classical pianist
 Hollis Resnik, 67, American musical theater singer and actress
 18
 Nicholas Angelich, 51, American classical pianist
 Harrison Birtwistle, 87, British classical composer
 José Luis Cortés, 70, Cuban timba flutist (NG La Banda)
 Jerry Doucette, 70, Canadian singer-songwriter and guitarist
 Andrzej Korzyński, 82, Polish classical composer
 Janez Matičič, 95, Slovenian classical composer
 20 – Guitar Shorty, 89, American blues guitarist
 22 – Jan Rot, 64, Dutch pop singer-songwriter
 23 – Arno, 72, Belgian rock singer (TC Matic)
 24
 Willi Resetarits, 73, Austrian cabaret singer
 Andrew Woolfolk, 71, American R&B saxophonist (Earth, Wind & Fire)
 25
 Susan Jacks, 73, Canadian pop singer-songwriter (The Poppy Family) and record producer
 Henny Vrienten, 73, Dutch ska singer-songwriter and bassist (Doe Maar)
 Shane Yellowbird, 42, Canadian country singer
 26 
 Julie Daraîche, 83, Canadian country singer
 Randy Rand, American hard rock bassist (Autograph)
 Klaus Schulze, 74, German electronic keyboardist and synthesizer player (Tangerine Dream, Ash Ra Tempel)
 27 
 Judy Henske, 85, American folk singer-songwriter
 Walter Rossi, 74, Italian-Canadian rock singer and guitarist (Influence, Luke & The Apostles)
 29 
 Allen Blairman, 81, American jazz drummer
 Roberto Lecaros, 77, Brazilian jazz multi-instrumentalist
 Tarsame Singh Saini, 54, British Asian fusion singer
 30 
 Ray Fenwick, 75, British rock guitarist (The Syndicats, The Spencer Davis Group, Ian Gillan Band)
 Naomi Judd, 76, American country singer (The Judds)
 Max Riebl, 30, Australian opera singer
 Gabe Serbian, American hardcore punk guitarist and drummer (The Locust, Dead Cross)

May
 1 
 Ric Parnell, 70, British hard rock drummer (Atomic Rooster, Spinal Tap)
 Régine Zylberberg, 92, Belgian torch singer
 2 – María José Cantilo, 68, Argentine folk singer-songwriter
 4 
 Richard Connolly, 94, Australian television and liturgical composer
 Albin Julius, 54, Austrian martial industrial multi-instrumentalist (Der Blutharsch, The Moon Lay Hidden Beneath a Cloud)
 Howie Pyro, 61, American punk rock bassist (D Generation, Danzig)
 6 – Jewell, 53, American R&B singer
 7 – Mickey Gilley, 86, American country singer-songwriter
 9 – Minoru Nojima, 76, Japanese classical pianist
 10
 Richard Benson, 41, British progressive rock guitarist and singer-songwriter
 Doug Caldwell, 94, New Zealand jazz pianist
 Kjell Lönnå, 85, Swedish classical composer and choir leader
 Shivkumar Sharma, 84, Indian classical santoor player (Shiv–Hari)
 11 
 William Bennett, 86, British classical flautist
 Trevor Strnad, 41, American melodic death metal singer (The Black Dahlia Murder)
 Alexander Toradze, 69, Georgian-born American classical pianist
 12 
 Andrei Alpatov, 55, Russian hard rock drummer (Trek)
 Djalu Gurruwiwi, 86, Aboriginal Australian traditional yiḏaki player
 Ben Moore, 80, American soul and gospel singer (James & Bobby Purify, The Blind Boys of Alabama)
 13 
 Teresa Berganza, 89, Spanish opera singer
 Lil Keed, 24, American rapper
 Rosmarie Trapp, 93, Austrian-born American choral singer (Trapp Family)
 14 – Robert Cogoi, 82, Belgian pop singer
 15 
 Deborah Fraser, 56, South African gospel singer
 Ricky Gardiner, 73, Scottish rock guitarist (Beggars Opera)
 17
 Rick Price, 77, British rock bassist (The Move, Wizzard)
 Vangelis, 79, Greek progressive rock and ambient keyboardist (Aphrodite's Child) and film composer
 18 
 Cathal Coughlan, 61, Irish indie rock singer-songwriter (Microdisney, The Fatima Mansions)
 Bob Neuwirth, 82, American singer-songwriter
 19 – Bernard Wright, 58, American jazz and funk singer and keyboardist
 21 – Yam Bing-yee, 90, Chinese opera singer
 23 – Thom Bresh, 74, American country singer
 25 – Jean-Louis Chautemps, 90, French jazz saxophonist
 26 
 Andy Fletcher, 60, British new wave and alternative rock keyboardist (Depeche Mode)
 Alan White, 72, British progressive rock drummer (Yes, Plastic Ono Band)
 29 
 Steve Broughton, 72, British psychedelic rock drummer (Edgar Broughton Band)
 Ronnie Hawkins, 87, American-Canadian rock and roll singer
 Sidhu Moose Wala, 28, Indian rapper and singer
 30 – Paul Vance, 92, American pop songwriter
 31 
 KK, 53, Indian playback singer
 Ingram Marshall, 80, American classical composer
 Kelly Joe Phelps, 62, American blues singer-songwriter and slide guitarist
 Dave Smith, American sound engineer, founder of Sequential, and co-creator of the Prophet-5

June
 1 – Deborah McCrary, 67, American gospel singer (The McCrary Sisters)
 2 
 Hal Bynum, 87, American country songwriter
 Gracia Montes, 86, Spanish cobla singer
 Bhajan Sopori, Indian classical santoor player
 3 
 El Noba, 25, Argentine cumbia singer
 Grachan Moncur III, 85, American jazz trombonist
 4
 Alec John Such, 70, American hard rock bassist (Bon Jovi)
 Trouble, 34, American rapper
 6 – Jim Seals, 79, American soft rock singer-songwriter (Seals and Crofts)
 9 
 Commander Tom, 59, German house and trance disc jockey
 Julee Cruise, 65, American dream pop singer-songwriter
 11 – Amb Osayomore Joseph, 69, Nigerian highlife singer-songwriter
 12 
 Gabe Baltazar, 92, American jazz saxophonist
 Roman Bunka, 70, German jazz fusion guitarist and oud player
 14 – Joel Whitburn, 82, American Billboard charts historian
 16 
 Big Rude Jake, 57, Canadian neo-swing singer-songwriter and bandleader
 Ivonne Haza, 83, Dominican opera singer
 Rino Vernizzi, 75, Italian jazz and classical bassoonist
 18 – Adibah Noor, 51, Malaysian pop singer
 19
 Jim Schwall, 79, American blues singer-songwriter and guitarist (Siegel–Schwall Band)
 Brett Tuggle, American rock keyboardist (Fleetwood Mac, Steppenwolf)
 20 – Dennis Cahill, 68, American Irish folk guitarist (The Gloaming)
 21 – Lewis Elliott, 84, American bassist (J. Frank Wilson and the Cavaliers)
 22 – Patrick Adams, 72, American disco arranger and producer (The Universal Robot Band, Musique)
 23
 Massimo Morante, 70, Italian progressive rock guitarist (Goblin)
 Yuri Shatunov, 48, Russian pop rock singer (Laskovyi Mai)
 Leluț Vasilescu, 66, Romanian rock drummer

July
 1 – Irene Fargo, 59, Italian pop and theater singer
 2 – Tristan Goodall, 48, Australian blues guitarist (The Audreys)
 3
 Miu Chu, 40, Taiwanese pop singer
 Antonio Cripezzi, 76, Italian pop singer and keyboardist (I Camaleonti)
 4 – Alan Blaikley, 82, British pop songwriter
 5 – Manny Charlton, 80, Scottish hard rock guitarist (Nazareth)
 7 – Adam Wade, 87, American pop singer
 8 – Alam Khan, 78, Bangladeshi film composer
 9 – Barbara Thompson, 77, British jazz saxophonist (Colosseum, United Jazz + Rock Ensemble)
 10
 Andrew Ball, 72, British classical pianist
 Chantal Gallia, 65, Algerian-born French pop singer and humorist
 11 – Monty Norman, 92, British film composer
 12 
 Bramwell Tovey, 69, British classical conductor and composer
 Jan Wijn, 88, Dutch classical pianist
 13
 A. B. Crentsil, 72, Ghanaian highlife guitarist
 Rubina Qureshi, 81, Pakistani classical singer
 14 – William Hart, 77, American R&B singer (The Delfonics)
 15 – Paul Ryder, 58, English alternative dance bassist (Happy Mondays)
 16 – Idris Phillips, 64, American jazz and folk pianist and guitarist
 17 – César Pedroso, 75, Cuban songo and timba pianist (Los Van Van, Pupy y Los que Son, Son)
 18 
 Vincent DeRosa, 101, American classical French hornist
 Povl Dissing, 84, Danish pop singer and guitarist
 Bhupinder Singh, 82, Indian ghazal and playback singer
 19 
 Michael Henderson, 71, American jazz fusion bassist and R&B singer
 Q Lazzarus, 59, American new wave singer
 Richard Seal, 86, British classical organist and conductor
 20 
 Alice Harnoncourt, 91, Austrian classical violinist
 Richard Harvey, Australian rock drummer (Divinyls, The Party Boys, Joe Walsh)
 Frederick Waite Jr., 55, English reggae drummer (Musical Youth)
 22
 Núria Feliu, 80, Spanish jazz and folk singer
 Kenichi Ōkuma, 56, Japanese video game music composer
 23 
 Mike Pela, 72, British record producer and mixing engineer
 Zayar Thaw, 41, Burmese rapper (Acid)
 24
 Vittorio De Scalzi, 72, Italian progressive rock singer and guitarist (New Trolls)
 Bob Heathcote, 58, American crossover thrash bassist (Suicidal Tendencies)
 25 
 Martin How, 90, British classical organist and composer
 Sandy Roberton, British record producer
 26 – Darío Gómez, 71, Colombian pop and ranchera singer
 27
 JayDaYoungan, 24, American rapper
 Mick Moloney, 77, Irish-American folk singer and folklorist
 Tom Springfield, 88, British folk pop singer-songwriter (The Springfields)
 28 – Bernard Cribbins, 93, English pop singer and actor
 29 – Jim Sohns, 75, American rock singer (The Shadows of Knight)
 30
 Archie Roach, 66, Australian folk singer-songwriter
 Raymond Raposa, American psychedelic folk singer-songwriter (Castanets)
 31 
 Nirmala Mishra, 83, Indian playback singer
 Mo Ostin, 95, American record executive

August
 1 – Rosa de Castilla, 90, Mexican ranchera singer
 3 – Nicky Moore, 75, British heavy metal singer (Samson)
 4
 Sam Gooden, 87, American soul singer (The Impressions)
 Ray Major, 73, British rock guitarist (Mott, British Lions, The Yardbirds)
 5 
 Judith Durham, 79, Australian pop-folk singer (The Seekers)
 Michael Lang, 80, American jazz and classical pianist
 6
 Daniel Lévi, 60, French pop singer-songwriter
 David Muse, 73, American country rock flautist, keyboardist and saxophonist (Firefall, The Marshall Tucker Band)
 Torgny Söderberg, 77, Swedish schlanger songwriter
 7 
 Ernesto Cavour, 82, Bolivian folk singer (Los Jairas)
 Gord Lewis, 65, Canadian punk rock guitarist (Teenage Head)
 8
 Lamont Dozier, 81, American songwriter and record producer (Holland–Dozier–Holland) and singer
 Darryl Hunt, 72, English folk punk bassist (The Pogues)
 Olivia Newton-John, 73, Australian pop and country singer-songwriter
 9 – Jussi Hakulinen, 57, Finnish pop rock singer-songwriter and keyboardist (Yö)
 10 – Abdul Wadud, 75, American jazz and classical cellist
 11
 Darius Campbell Danesh, 41, Scottish pop singer
 Mohamed Huzam, 52, Maldivian playback singer
 Bill Pitman, 102, American jazz, pop, and rock guitarist (The Wrecking Crew)
 Shimoga Subbanna, 83, Indian playback singer
 12 – Ebrahim Ghanbari Mehr, 94, Iranian musical instrument maker
 14 – Svika Pick, 72, Israeli songwriter
 15 
 Steve Grimmett, 62, English heavy metal singer (Grim Reaper, Onslaught, Lionsheart).
 Hans Magnusson, 73, Swedish dansband saxophonist (Thorleifs)
 Tokollo Tshabalala, 45, South African kwaito singer-songwriter (TKZee)
 16 
 Kal David, 79, American blues singer and guitarist
 Matti Lehtinen, 100, Finnish opera singer
 18 – Rolf Kühn, 92, German jazz clarinetist and saxophonist
 19 – Ted Kirkpatrick, 62, American Christian thrash metal drummer and songwriter (Tourniquet)
 20
 Helen Grayco, 97, American pop singer
 Nayyara Noor, 71, Pakistani playback and ghazal singer
 Paul Tesluk, 82, American rock and roll organist (Johnny and the Hurricanes)
 21 – Monnette Sudler, 70, American jazz guitarist
 22
 Jerry Allison, 82, American rock and roll drummer and songwriter (The Crickets), and singer
 Stuart Anstis, 48, British extreme metal guitarist (Cradle of Filth)
 Jaimie Branch, 39, American free jazz trumpeter and composer
 Fredy Studer, 72, Swizz jazz fusion drummer
 Piotr Szkudelski, 66, Polish rock drummer (Perfect)
 Margaret Urlich, 57, New Zealand pop singer
 23 – Creed Taylor, 93, American jazz trumpeter, record producer and music executive
 25
 Joey DeFrancesco, 51, American jazz organist, saxophonist and trumpeter
 Mable John, 91, American R&B singer (The Raelettes)
 26 – Hana Zagorová, 75, Czech pop singer
 27
 Georges Al Rassi, 42, Lebanese Khaliji singer
 Manolo Sanlúcar, 78, Spanish flamenco guitarist
 29 
 Luke Bell, 32, American country music singer 
 John P. Varkey, 52, Indian alternative rock guitarist (Avial) and film composer
 31 – Mark Shreeve, 65, British electronic composer and synthesizer player (Redshift)

September
 1 – Bamba Bakya, 49, Indian playback singer
 2 
 Jordi Cervelló, 86, Spanish classical composer
 Drummie Zeb, 62, British reggae drummer and singer (Aswad)
 4 
 Wes Freed, 58, American artist and album cover designer (Drive-By Truckers, Lauren Hoffman)
 Edward Hulewicz, 84, Polish pop singer
 John Till, 76, Canadian blues rock guitarist (Full Tilt Boogie Band, The Revols)
 5 – Lars Vogt, 51, German classical composer
 7
 Jimbo Doares, 78, American rock and roll guitarist (The Swingin' Medallions)
Dave Sherman, 55, American doom metal bassist and singer (Spirit Caravan, Earthride, Wretched)
 8 
 Marciano Cantero, 62, Argentine rock singer and bassist (Enanitos Verdes)
 Sonny West, 85, American rockabilly singer-songwriter and guitarist
 9
 Carol Arnauld, 61, French pop singer
 Herschel Sizemore, 87, American bluegrass mandolinist
 Trevor Tomkins, 81, British jazz fusion drummer (Gilgamesh)
 10
 Paulino Bernal, 83, American Tex-Mex accordionist
 Jorja Fleezanis, 70, American classical violinist
 Choichi Terukina, 90, Japanese Ryukyuan sanshin player
 12 
 Dennis East, 73, South African hard rock singer-songwriter (Stingray)
 Ramsey Lewis, 87, American jazz pianist and composer
 PnB Rock, 30, American rapper
 13
 Kornelije Kovač, 80, Serbian progressive rock keyboardist (Korni Grupa, Indexi) and classical composer
 Jesse Powell, 51, American R&B singer
 14
 David Andersson, 47, Swedish heavy metal guitarist (Soilwork, The Night Flight Orchestra)
 Jim Post, 82, American folk singer-songwriter (Friend & Lover)
 Paul Sartin, 51, British folk singer and multi-instrumentalist (Bellowhead, Faustus, Belshazzar's Feast)
 16 – Marva Hicks, 66, American soul singer
 18 – Diane Guérin, 74, Canadian pop singer
 21 
 Ray Edenton, 95, American country and rock guitarist
 Anton Fier, 66, American alternative rock drummer (The Feelies, The Golden Palominos, The Lounge Lizards)
 22 
 Stu Allan, 60, British eurodance DJ (Clock)
 John Hartman, 72, American rock drummer (The Doobie Brothers)
 24 
 Sue Mingus, 92, American record producer
 Pharoah Sanders, 81, American jazz saxophonist
 26 – Joe Bussard, 86, American record collector
 27
Boris Moiseev, 68, Russian pop singer
 Christian Hummer, 32, Austrian indie rock keyboardist (Wanda)
 28 – Coolio, 59, American rapper
 29 – Prins Póló, 45, Icelandic indie rock singer-songwriter
 30 — Walkie T, 27, Russian rapper

October
 1
 Stamatis Kokotas, 88, Greek folk singer
 Kevin Locke, 68, American traditional folk flautist
 Bin Valencia, 61, Argentine heavy metal drummer (Almafuerte)
 2 – Mary McCaslin, 75, American folk singer-songwriter
 3 – Mon Legaspi, 54, Filipino hard rock bassist (Wolfgang)
 4 
 Jean Gallois, 93, French musicologist and classical violinist
 Loretta Lynn, 90, American country singer-songwriter
 5 
 Lenny Lipton, 82, American folk lyricist
 Ann-Christine Nyström, 76, Swedish pop singer
 6
 Adriana Breukink, Dutch classical recorder player and instrument maker
 Fred Catero, 89, American record producer and engineer
 Ivy Jo Hunter, 82, American R&B songwriter
 Jody Miller, 80, American country singer
 Judy Tenuta, 65, American comedy music singer-songwriter
 7
 Ronnie Cuber, 80, American jazz saxophonist
 Toshi Ichiyanagi, 89, Japanese classical pianist
 Art Laboe, 97, American radio disk jockey
 Jure Robežnik, 89, Slovenian jazz pianist
 8 – Charlie Brown, 80, American radio disk jockey
 9 
 Andres Cuervo, 34, Colombian pop singer-songwriter
 Chuck Deardorf, 68, American jazz bassist
 Josep Soler i Sardà, 87, Spanish classical and opera composer
 10 
 Anita Kerr, 94, American country and pop singer and arranger
 Leon Schidlowsky, 91, Chilean-Israeli classical composer
 11 
 Angela Lansbury, 96, British-American theater singer and actress
 Willie Spence, 23, American R&B singer
 12 
 Monsta O, 56, American rapper (Boo-Yaa T.R.I.B.E.)
 Yurii Kerpatenko, 46, Ukrainian conductor, orchestrator and accordionist
 13 
 Fuzzy, 83, Danish multi-genre composer
 Verckys Kiamuangana Mateta, 78, Congolese rumba saxophonist
 Susanna Mildonian, 82, Italian-born Belgian classical harpist
 Christina Moser, 70, Swiss new wave singer-songwriter (Krisma)
 Steve Roberts, 68, British punk drummer (U.K. Subs)
 Mike Schank, 56, American film composer and guitarist
 Joyce Sims, 63, American R&B-dance singer-songwriter
 14 – Mariana Nicolesco, 73, Romanian opera singer
 15
 Noel Duggan, 73, Irish folk singer and guitarist (Clannad, The Duggans)
 Mikaben, 41, Haitian compas and dancehall singer-songwriter
 Marty Sammon, 45, American blues and ragtime keyboardist
 17 – Michael Ponti, 84, German classical pianist
 18
 Franco Gatti, 80, Italian pop singer (Ricchi e Poveri)
 Robert Gordon, 75, American rockabilly singer
 19 
 Geoff Nuttall, 56, Canadian chamber music violinist (St. Lawrence String Quartet)
 Joanna Simon, 84, American opera singer
 20
 Atarah Ben-Tovim, 82, British classical flautist
 Bettye Crutcher, 83, American R&B singer
 Lucy Simon, 82, American composer and folk singer (The Simon Sisters)
 Tsin Ting, 88, Taiwanese film singer
 21 – Robert Gordy, 91, American music publishing executive and recording artist
 22 – Luiz Galvão, 87, Brazilian psychedelic rock and MPB songwriter (Novos Baianos)
 23 
 Don Edwards, 86, American Western singer
 Libor Pešek, 89, Czech classical conductor
 Galina Pisarenko, 88, Russian opera singer
 24 
 Christine Farnon, 97, American music executive
 Gregg Philbin, American rock bassist (REO Speedwagon)
 25 
 Branislav Hronec, 81, Slovak classical pianist and conductor
 Paul Stoddard, American metalcore singer (Diecast)
 26 
 Lia Origoni, 103, Italian opera and musical theater singer
 Agustín Ramírez, 70, Mexican Grupera singer-songwriter (Los Caminantes)
 27 – Geraldine Hunt, 77, American R&B singer
 28 
 Jerry Lee Lewis, 87, American rock and roll singer and pianist
 D. H. Peligro, 63, American punk rock drummer (Dead Kennedys, Red Hot Chili Peppers)
 29
 Ryan Karazija, 40, American-Icelandic indie rock singer-songwriter and guitarist (Low Roar)
 Robin Sylvester, British jam band bassist (RatDog)
 30
 John McGale, 66, Canadian blues rock singer and multi-instrumentalist (Offenbach)
 Anthony Ortega, 94, American jazz clarinetist
 31
 Michal Ambrož, 68, Czech rock singer and guitarist (Jasná Páka)
 Patrick Haggerty, 78, American country singer-songwriter (Lavender Country)
 Danny Javier, 75, Filipino pop and OPM singer (APO Hiking Society)

November
 1 
 Tsuneo Fukuhara, 89, Japanese classical composer
 Takeoff, 28, American rapper (Migos)
 Joseph Tarsia, 88, American recording engineer and studio owner (Sigma Sound Studios)
 2 – Atilio Stampone, 96, Argentine tango pianist and composer
 3
 Gerd Dudek, 84, German jazz saxophonist, clarinetist, and flautist
 Noel McKoy, 62, British soul singer
 4 – Nicole Josy, 76, Belgian pop singer (Nicole and Hugo)
 5 
 Daniele Barioni, 92, Italian opera singer
 Aaron Carter, 34, American pop singer
 Tyrone Downie, 66, Jamaican reggae keyboardist (Bob Marley and The Wailers)
 Carmelo La Bionda, 73, Italian disco producer and songwriter (La Bionda)
 Mimi Parker, American indie rock singer and drummer (Low)
 6 
 Ali Birra, 72, Ethiopian folk singer
 Hurricane G, 52, American rapper
 Tame One, 52, American rapper (Artifacts, Leak Bros, The Weathermen)
 7 
 Sergey Kuznetsov, 58, Russian pop rock keyboardist and songwriter (Laskovyi Mai)
 Jeff Cook, 73, American country guitarist (Alabama)
 8 
 Will Ferdy, 95, Belgian pop singer
 Claes-Göran Hederström, 77, Swedish schlager singer
 Pierre Kartner, 87, Dutch schlager singer-songwriter
 Dan McCafferty, 76, Scottish hard rock singer-songwriter (Nazareth)
 9 
 Gal Costa, 77, Brazilian Tropicália singer
 Mattis Hætta, 63, Norwegian pop singer
 Garry Roberts, 72, Irish new wave guitarist (The Boomtown Rats)
 10
 Chris Koerts, 74, Dutch pop rock guitarist (Earth and Fire)
 Nik Turner, 82, British space rock flautist and saxophonist (Hawkwind, Inner City Unit, Space Ritual)
 11 
 Keith Levene, 65, British post-punk guitarist (Public Image Ltd., The Clash)
 Rab Noakes, 75, Scottish folk singer-songwriter and guitarist (Stealers Wheel)
 12 – Gene Cipriano, 94, American jazz and pop multi-instrumentalist (The Wrecking Crew)
 14 – Jerzy Połomski. 89, Polish folk and pop singer
 15 – Jin Tielin, 82, Chinese vocal coach
 16 – Mick Goodrick, 77, American jazz guitarist
 17 
 Azio Corghi, 85, Italian classical composer
 Ken Mansfield, 85, American record producer
 B. Smyth, 28, American R&B singer
 18 – Ned Rorem, 99, American classical composer
 19
 Nico Fidenco, 89, Italian pop singer
 Danny Kalb, 80, American blues rock guitarist (The Blues Project)
 20 
 Joyce Bryant, 95, American pop singer
 Riho Sibul, 64, Estonian rock singer and guitarist (Ultima Thule)
 21 – Wilko Johnson, 75, British pub rock guitarist and songwriter (Dr. Feelgood)
 22
 Erasmo Carlos, 81, Brazilian MPB singer-songwriter
 Pablo Milanés, 79, Cuban nueva trova singer-songwriter
 23
 Hugo Helmig, 24, Danish pop singer
 Shel Macrae, 77, British pop rock singer and guitarist (The Fortunes)
 25 
 Irene Cara, 63, American pop singer-songwriter and actress
 Charles Koppelman, 82, American music executive and pop singer (The Ivy Three)
 Don Newkirk, 56, American film composer and record producer
 Sammie Okposo, 51, Nigerian gospel singer
 26 – Louise Tobin, 104, American jazz singer
 27 – Jake Flint, 37, American Red Dirt country singer
 30 
 Christine McVie, 79, British rock and blues singer-songwriter and keyboardist (Fleetwood Mac, Chicken Shack)
 Steve Smith, British punk singer (Red Alert)

December
 1 
 Haralds Sīmanis, 71, Latvian pop singer
 Tord Sjöman, 82, Swedish dansband organist (Vikingarna)
 Andrew Speight, 58, Australian jazz saxophonist
 2 
 Jo Carol Pierce, 78, American folk rock singer-songwriter
 Laila Storch, 101, American classical oboist 
 3 
 Jess Barr, 46, American alternative country guitarist (Slobberbone)
 Jamie Freeman, 57, British folk singer-songwriter
 Svenne Hedlund, 77, Swedish pop and schlager singer (Idolerna, Hep Stars, Svenne and Lotta)
 Volodymyr Kozhukhar, 81, Ukrainian classical composer
 Bobby Naughton, 78, American jazz vibraphonist and pianist
 Alexandre Zelkine, 84, French folk singer
 4 – Manuel Göttsching, 70, German Krautrock and electronic synthesizer player and guitarist (Ash Ra Tempel, Ashra)
 5 – Hamsou Garba, 63, Nigerien singer
 6 
 Jet Black, 84, British punk rock drummer (The Stranglers)
 Hamish Kilgour, 65, New Zealand indie rock drummer and singer (The Clean, Bailter Space)
 Edino Krieger, 94, Brazilian avant garde composer
 7 – Roddy Jackson, 70, American rockabilly singer and pianist
 8 – Yitzhak Klepter, 72, Israeli psychedelic rock singer and guitarist (The Churchills, Kaveret)
 9
 Jovit Baldivino, 29, Filipino pop rock singer
 Gaston Bogaerts, 101, Belgian Latin soul percussionist (The Chakachas)
 Herbert Deutsch, 90, American composer and inventor (Moog synthesizer)
 Qamar Gula, 70, Afghan pop singer
 10
 John Aler, 73, American opera singer
 J. J. Barnes, 79, American R&B singer
 Sulochana Chavan, 89, Indian Lavani singer
 Tracy Hitchings, 60, British progressive rock singer (Landmarq)
 Tshala Muana, 64, Congolese Soukous singer
 Aziouz Raïs, 68, Algerian chaabi singer
 José Ángel Trelles, 78, Argentine tango singer
 Kihnu Virve, 94, Estonian folk singer
 11 – Angelo Badalamenti, 85, American film and television composer
 12 – Ekambi Brillant, 74, Cameroonian makossa singer
 13
 Sol Amarfio, 84, Ghanaian-British afro rock drummer (Osibisa)
 Benjamin Bossi, 69, American new wave saxophonist (Romeo Void)
 Grand Daddy I.U., 54, American rapper
 Luis "Checho" González, 89, Chilean folk singer
 Nihal Nelson, 76, Sri Lankan soul and pop singer
 Bayan Northcott, 82, British classical composer and music critic
 Lalo Rodríguez, 64, Puerto Rican salsa singer
 Kim Simmonds, 75, British rock guitarist (Savoy Brown)
 14 
 Djene Djento, Cameroonian makossa singer-songwriter
 Koji Ryu, 60, Japanese rock drummer (C-C-B)
 15
 Bertha Barbee, 82, American R&B singer (The Velvelettes)
 Dino Danelli, 78, American rock drummer (The Rascals)
 Shirley Eikhard, 67, Canadian country singer-songwriter
 16
 Rick Anderson, 75, American new wave bassist (The Tubes)
 Jean-Paul Corbineau, 74, French folk singer-songwriter (Tri Yann)
 Charlie Gracie, 86, American rock and roll singer and guitarist
 17 
 Urmas Sisask, 62, Estonian classical composer
 Yuji Tanaka, 65, Japanese rock drummer (Anzen Chitai)
 18 
 Martin Duffy, 55, British alternative rock keyboardist (Felt, Primal Scream)
 Terry Hall, 63, British ska and new wave singer-songwriter (The Specials, Fun Boy Three, The Colourfield, Vegas)
 Wim Henderickx, 60, Belgian classical composer and percussionist
 19 
 Claudisabel, 40, Portuguese pop singer
 Stanley Drucker, 93, American classical clarinetist
 Sandy Edmonds, 74, British-New Zealand pop singer
 20 
 Randy Begg, 71, Canadian pop drummer (Wednesday)
 Iain Templeton, British alternative rock drummer (The La's, Shack)
 21 
 Harvey Jett, 73, American Southern rock guitarist (Black Oak Arkansas)
 Bilqees Khanum, Pakistani classical singer
 Mauro Sabbione, 65, Italian pop keyboardist (Matia Bazar)
 22 
 Thom Bell, 79, Jamaican-born American soul songwriter and arranger
 Big Scarr, 22, American rapper
 Walter "Wolfman" Washington, 79, American blues singer and guitarist
 23 
 David Dalton, 88, American classical violist
 Maxi Jazz, 65, British electronic singer-songwriter (Faithless)
 Madosini, 78, South African traditional Uhadi musical bow player
 Massimo Savić, 60, Croatian art rock and pop singer (Dorian Gray)
 24 – Mampintsha, 40, South African kwaito singer (Big Nuz)
 25
 Azuquita, 76, Panamanian salsa singer
 Brian Casser, 86, British rock and roll singer and guitarist
 Paul Fox, American record producer (XTC, Phish, 10,000 Maniacs)
 26 
 Penda Dallé, 64, Cameroonian makossa guitarist
 Lasse Lönndahl, 94, Swedish pop singer
 27
 Jo Mersa Marley, 31, Jamaican reggae singer
 Harry Sheppard, 94, American jazz vibraphonist
 28
 Scott Nash, Australian hard rock bassist (Asteroid B-612)
 Black Stalin, 81, Trinidadian calypso singer
 Linda de Suza, 74, Portuguese pop singer
 29
 Eduard Artemyev, 85, Russian film composer
 Giovanni Pezzoli, 70, Italian pop rock drummer (Stadio)
 Ian Tyson, 89, Canadian folk singer-songwriter (Ian & Sylvia)
 31
 Jeremiah Green, 45, American indie rock drummer (Modest Mouse)
 Anita Pointer, 74, American R&B singer (The Pointer Sisters)

See also

Timeline of musical events
Women in music

References

 
2022-related lists
Music by year
Music
Culture-related timelines by year